Reynaldo Fernandes Cisotto Gianecchini Júnior (born 12 November 1972) is a Brazilian actor and model.

Career
Gianecchini started acting at the age of 6, on the stage of his school in Birigüi, São Paulo. He graduated with a degree in law from the Pontifical Catholic University of São Paulo (PUC-SP) in 1997, but he never practiced it.

His dream of becoming an actor was delayed by his modeling career. He was a successful model for eight years, of which two were overseas, residing in Paris, but all the while he was traveling to such cities as New York, London, Berlin, and Milan. He was unhappy, though, and decided to resume his pursuit of an acting career.

In 2001, he landed his first significant regular role in the soap opera Laços de Família. He played the role of Edu, a doctor who was romantically involved with a woman many years older than he was, played by actress Vera Fischer.

In 2002, Gianecchini was chosen to be the exclusive top model for Armani in Brazil, a position he apparently still holds to this date (Maria Fernanda Candido, his co-star in Esperança, is the female equivalent for Armani).

Personal life
Since August 2011, Gianecchini has been battling against cancer (angioimmunoblastic T-cell lymphoma) and has undergone chemotherapy treatment. In an interview with O Globo in September 2019, he stated that although he has dated both women and men, he does not identify as any sexual orientation. In September 2020, he stated that he identifies as pansexual. Gianecchini has Italian ancestry.

Filmography

Television

Film

Theater
 Cacilda
 Boca de Ouro
 O Príncipe de Copacabana
 A Peça Sobre o Bebê
 Vossa Excelência, o Candidato
 Doce Deleite
 Cruel
 A Toca do Coelho
 Os Guardas de Taj

Music
 "Você" (with Marília Gabriela)

References

External links

 
 

1972 births
20th-century Brazilian male actors
21st-century Brazilian male actors
Brazilian male film actors
Brazilian male models
Brazilian male stage actors
Brazilian male telenovela actors
Brazilian male voice actors
Brazilian people of Italian descent
Brazilian LGBT actors
LGBT male actors
LGBT models
Living people
Male actors from São Paulo (state)
Pansexual entertainers
Pansexual men
People from Birigui